The ninth legislative assembly election of Tamil Nadu was held on 21 January 1989. Dravida Munnetra Kazhagam (DMK) won the election and its leader M. Karunanidhi, became the Chief Minister. It was his third term in office. The DMK was in power only for a short term, as it was dismissed on 31 January 1991 by the Indian Prime minister Chandra Shekhar using Article 356 (Otherwise) of the Indian Constitution.

Background

Split in AIADMK
After the death of M. G. Ramachandran (M.G.R) in December 1987, his wife V. N. Janaki Ramachandran took over as Chief Minister. She lasted less than a month in power. The All India Anna Dravida Munnetra Kazhagam (AIADMK) split into two factions, one led by Janaki and the other by J. Jayalalithaa. The undivided AIADMK legislature party had a strength of 132 including the Speaker P. H. Pandian. 97 of them supported the Janaki faction while 33 backed the Jayalalithaa group. Speaker Pandian was a supporter of Janaki. He did not recognize the Jayalalithaa group as a separate party. On 28 January 1988, Janaki sought a vote of confidence in the Assembly. The Jayalalithaa group abstained from the assembly and Pandian disqualified all of them. Earlier in December 1986, 10 MLAs of the DMK had been expelled from the Assembly by Pandian for their participation in the anti-Hindi agitation of 1986, bringing down the strength of the house to 224. The disqualification of the 33 MLAs of the Jayalalithaa group by P.H.Pandian further reduced the assembly's strength to 191. This enabled Janaki to win the vote of confidence with the support of only 99 members (with 8 opposing votes and 3 neutrals). Other opposition parties boycotted the vote - only 111 members were present during the motion. Though she won the vote of confidence, her government was dismissed by prime minister Rajiv Gandhi on 30 January citing the disruptions in the assembly. After a year of President's rule, elections were again held in January 1989. Both the AIADMK factions claimed to be the official AIADMK and requested the election commission to grant the "two leaves" symbol of the AIADMK to them. However, the election commission refused to recognize either of them as the official AIADMK and temporarily froze the "two leaves" symbol. Instead it awarded the "cock" symbol to the Jayalalithaa faction (AIADMK(J)), while the Janaki faction (AIADMK(JA)) was given the "two doves" symbol.

Coalitions
The Tamil Nadu unit of the Indian National Congress initially decided to ally with the Jayalalithaa faction. This move was opposed by actor and Congress leader Sivaji Ganesan. On 10 February 1988, he left the party along with his supporters to form a new party Thamizhaga Munnetra Munnani. Ganesan's party allied itself with the Janaki faction. Eventually, the Congress also contested the elections alone.

The DMK was part of the Janata Dal led National Front. The front initially included both the Communist Party of India (CPI) and Communist Party of India (Marxist) (CPM). However, in the election only Janata Dal and CPM had a seat sharing agreement with the DMK. The CPI allied itself with the AIADMK(J).

This election attracted unusually high level of attention at the national level. It was seen as a precursor for the General election of 1989, a test of Rajiv Gandhi's popularity and P.H.Pandian's popularity as a speaker claiming Sky High Powers. The Tamil Nadu Congress (under G. K. Moopanar) was contesting elections alone after a gap of twelve years and Rajjiv Gandhi campaigned extensively making multiple campaign visits to Tamil Nadu. V. P. Singh and Jyoti Basu, the national leaders of Janata Dal and CPM respectively also campaigned for the DMK led front in Tamil Nadu.

Seat allotments

DMK Front

AIADMK (Jayalalithaa) Front

†: The four seats that were delayed were contested by a united AIADMK front (AIADMK(J) & AIADMK(JA)), under the leader Jayalalithaa in a bye-election.

AIADMK (Janaki) Front

Congress

Voting and results
The election for 232 constituencies was held on 21 January 1989. The turnout among registered voters was 69.69%. Elections could not be held for two constituencies -Marungapuri and Madurai East - due to technical reasons. For these two elections were conducted later on 11 March 1989. Since the two AIADMK factions had merged in February 1989 under the leadership of Jayalalitha, the Election Commission restored the "Two Leaves" symbol to the unified AIADMK for these elections. The unified AIADMK won both the seats.

Results by Pre-Poll Alliance 

|-
! style="background-color:#E9E9E9;text-align:left;vertical-align:top;" |Alliance/Party
!style="width:4px" |
! style="background-color:#E9E9E9;text-align:right;" |Seats won
! style="background-color:#E9E9E9;text-align:right;" |Change†
! style="background-color:#E9E9E9;text-align:right;" |Popular Vote
! style="background-color:#E9E9E9;text-align:right;" |Vote %
! style="background-color:#E9E9E9;text-align:right;" |Adj. %‡
|-
! style="background-color:#FF0000; color:white"|DMK+ alliance
! style="background-color: " |
| 169
| +137
| 9,135,220
| colspan=2 style="text-align:center;vertical-align:middle;"| 37.9%
|-
|DMK
! style="background-color: #FF0000" |
| 150
| +126
| 8,001,222
| 33.2%
| 38.7%
|-
|CPI(M)
! style="background-color: #000080" |
| 15
| +10
| 851,351
| 3.5%
| 36.5%
|-
|JNP
! style="background-color: #FFFF00" |
| 4
| +1
| 282,647
| 1.2%
| 29.1%
|-
! style="background-color:#009900; color:white"|AIADMK(J)+ alliance
! style="background-color: " | 
| 30
| -5
| 5,393,857
| colspan=2 style="text-align:center;vertical-align:middle;"| 22.4%
|-
|AIADMK(J)
! style="background-color: lime" |
| 27
| -6
| 5,098,687
| 22.2%
| 25.0%
|-
|CPI
! style="background-color: #0000FF" |
| 3
| +1
| 295,170
| 1.2%
| 21.3%
|-
! style="background-color:gray; color:white"|Others
! style="background-color:gray" |
| 33
| -132
| 9,160,163
| colspan=2 style="text-align:center;vertical-align:middle;"| 38.0%
|-
|INC
! style="background-color: #00FFFF" |
| 26
| -37
| 4,780,714
| 19.8%
| 21.8%
|-
|AIADMK(JA)
! style="background-color: olive" |
| 2
| -95
| 2,214,965
| 9.2%
| 12.2%
|-
|IND
! style="background-color: #666666" |
| 5
| +1
| 2,164,484
| 9.0%
| 9.1%
|-
| style="text-align:center;" |Total
! style="background-color: " |
| 232
| –
| 24,111,468
| 100%
| style="text-align:center;" | –
|-
|}
Sources: Election Commission of India

Analysis
The split in the AIADMK and the Congress contesting alone split the opposition votes, while the DMK retained its vote bank and won a comfortable majority. Janaki Ramachandran, contesting from Andipatti, lost to DMK's P. Asayan by less than a 5000 vote margin, in a four-way contest between AIADMK (Janaki), AIADMK (Jayalalithaa), Congress, and DMK.

Cabinet

See also 
 Elections in Tamil Nadu
 Legislature of Tamil Nadu
 Government of Tamil Nadu
|Ninth
|1989-91
|S. Krishnamoorthy
|Dravida Munnetra Kazhagam
|-

Footnotes

External links
 Election Commission of India

State Assembly elections in Tamil Nadu
1980s in Tamil Nadu
Tamil Nadu